Dee is a rural locality in the local government area (LGA) of Central Highlands in the Central LGA region of Tasmania. The 2016 census recorded a population of 7 for the state suburb of Dee.

History 
Dee was gazetted as a locality in 1973. 

Dee was the site of a telegraph relay station on the only telegraph link to the west coast in earlier days.

Geography
The Dee Lagoon is in the centre of the locality, contained by the Dee Dam. The Dee River flows into the lagoon from the north, and continues south from the dam.

Road infrastructure 
Route C173 (Victoria Valley Road) runs through from north-west to south-east.

References

Towns in Tasmania
Localities of Central Highlands Council